EFMI may refer to:

 Escape from Monkey Island, a computer adventure game developed and released by LucasArts in 2000
 Mikkeli Airport (ICAO airport code: EFMI) in Mikkeli, Finland
 European Federation for Medical Informatics